Yosemitea may refer to:
 Yosemitea (plant), a genus of flowering plants in the family Brassicaceae
 Yosemitea (wasp), a genus of wasps in the family Pteromalidae